Subcomandante Marcos is the de facto spokesman for the Zapatista Army of National Liberation (EZLN), a Mexican rebel movement. He was also known as Delegado Cero during the EZLN's Other Campaign (2006–2007), and since May 2014 has gone by the name Subcomandante Galeano.

Marcos is an author, political poet, and outspoken opponent of globalization, capitalism and neo-liberalism. Marcos wants the Mexican constitution changed to recognize the rights of the country's indigenous Mexicans. The internationally known guerrillero has  been described as a "new" and "postmodern" Che Guevara, or a cross between Mad Max and Zorro. Published translations of his writings, speeches and interviews exist in at least fourteen languages.

Publications

Basque 
Marcos Komandanteordea [Subcomandante Marcos] (2003). Zapataren koloreak [Zapatista Colours].  Navarra, Spain: Txalaparta, 2003. .

Chinese 
蒙面骑士: 墨西哥副司令马科斯文集 [The Masked Knight: Mexico's Subcomandante Marcos]. 上海 [Shanghai], 中国 [China]:上海人民出版社 [Shanghai People's Publishing House]. 2006. .

English 

 Republished as: 
 Revised edition: Subcomandante Marcos (2000). Clarke, Ben, and Clifton Ross (eds). Voices of Fire: Communiqués and Interviews from the Zapatista Army of National Liberation. Revised ed. San Francisco, CA, USA: Freedom Voices, 2000.

 Autonomedia (1994). ¡Zapatistas! Documents of the New Mexican Revolution. New York: Autonomedia, 1994.

Subcomandante Marcos (1998). Ezln Communiques: Masks & Silences, April 15, 1998–July 19, 1998 (The Fringe Ser.: From the Mountains of Southeast Mexico). Oakland, California, USA: Agit press Collective, 1998. .
Subcomandante Marcos (1998). Ezln Communiques: The War Against Forgetting, Aug. 28, 1998–Nov. 4, 1998 (The Fringe Ser.: From the Mountains of Southeast Mexico). Oakland, California, USA: Agit press Collective, 1998. .
Subcomandante Marcos (1998). Ezln Communiques: Navigating the Seas, Dec. 22, 1997–Jan. 29, 1998. Berkeley, Ca.: Regent Press, 1998.
 Ruggiero, Greg, and Stewart Shahulka, eds. (1998). Zapatistas Encuentro: Documents from the 1996 Encounter for Humanity and Against Neoliberalism. New York: Seven Stories.

 Subcomandante Marcos (2001). Zapatista Stories. Translated by Dinah Livingstone. London: Katabasis, 2001.

Subcomandante Marcos (2005). Chiapas: Resistance and Rebellion. Coimbatore, India: Vitiyal Pathippagam, 2005.

 Subcomandante Marcos (2016). Critical Thought in the Face of the Capitalist Hydra. Durham, NC: PaperBoat, 2016.
Subcomandante Marcos (2017). Professionals of Hope: The Selected Writings of Subcomandante Marcos. Brooklyn: The Song Cave, 2017.
Subcomandante Marcos (2018). The Zapatistas’ Dignified Rage: Final Public Speeches of Subcommander Marcos. Edited by Nick Henck. Translated by Henry Gales. Chico: AK Press, 2018.
Subcomandante Marcos (2021). For Life: Communiques from the Zapatistas in advance of their tour of Europe 2020-2021. Bristol, UK: Active Distribution, 2021.
Subcomandante Marcos (2022). Zapatista Stories for Dreaming An-Other World (Kairos). Oakland, CA: PM Press, 2022.

French 

 
 
 
 Subcomandante Marcos (1997). Le rêve zapatiste, Yvon Le Bot entretien avec le sous-commandant Marcos [The Zapatista Dream: Yvon Le Bot's interview with Subcomandante Marcos] éd. du Seuil, Paris, 1997.  .
 Subcomandante Marcos; Ignacio Ramonet (2001). Marcos. La dignité rebelle. Conversations avec le sous-commandant Marcos [Marcos: Rebel Dignity: conversations with Subcomandante Marcos]. Galilée, Paris 2001, .
 
 Republished: 
 Manuel Vázquez Montalbán (2003). Marcos. Le mâitre des miroirs [Marcos: The Lord of Mirrors]. Mille et nuits, 2003.
 
 Subcomandante Marcos (2004). EZLN: 20 et 10, le feu et la parole [20 & 10: Fire and Word], Gloria Muñoz Ramírez, éd. Nautilus, Paris, 2004.
 
Subcomandante Marcos (2007). Mexique: Calendrier de la résistance [Mexico: Calendar of Resistance]. Paris, France: Rue de cascades, 2007. .
Subcomandante Marcos (2009). Saisons de la Digne Rage [Season of Dignified Rage]. Ed. Jérôme Baschet. Paris, France: Climats, 2009. 
Subcomandante Marcos (2011). La Récit du vieil Antonio [The Story of Old Antonio = The Story of Colours]. Paris, France: Oskar éditeur, 2011. .
 Subcomandantes Marcos and Moisés (2013). Eux et Nous [Them and Us], Éditions de l'Escargot, Paris, 2013.
 Subcomandante Marcos (2013). Éthique et politique [Ethics and Politics], Éditions de l'Escargot, Paris, 2013.
Subcomandante Marcos (2014). Contes rebelles: Récits du sous-commandant Marcos [Rebel Tales: Stories by Subcomandante Marcos]. Les Lilas, Paris, France: Muscadier, 2014. .
Subcomandante Marcos/Galeano (2018). Pistes zapatistes: La pensée critique face à l'hydre capitaliste [Zapatista Tracks: Critical Thought in the Face of the Capitalist Hydra]. Paris, France: Co-édition Albache, Nada et Solidaires International, 2018. .

German 

 Subcomandante Marcos; Marta Durán de Huerta (2001). Yo Marcos, Gespräche über die zapatistische Bewegung [I, Marcos: Conversations about the Zapatista Movement]. Hamburg, Germany: Nautilus Verlag, 2001. .
 Manuel Vázquez Montalbán (2001). Marcos. Herr der Spiegel [Marcos: The Lord of Mirrors]. Wagenbach, 2001. ISBN 9783803124227.
Subcomandante Marcos (2003). Der Kalendar de Widerstandes [The Calendar of Resistance]. Frankfurt, Germany: Verlag Edition AV. .
Gloria Muñoz Ramírez (2004). EZLN: 20+10 – Das Feuer und das Wort (in German). Foreword by Hermann Bellinghausen and Introduction by Subcomandante Marcos. Münster, Germany: Unrast Verlag, 2004. .

 
 Subcomandante Marcos (2007). Geschichten vom alten Antonio. Verlag Assoziation A, Berlin 2007, .
 
Subcomandante Marcos (2010). Die Anderen Geschichten / Los Otros Cuentos [The Other Tales]. Münster, Germany: Unrast Verlag, 2010: .
Subcomandante Marcos (2016). Das kritische Denken angesichts der kapitalistischen Hydra: Beiträge von EZLN-Aktivist*innen zu Theorie und Praxis der zapatistischen Bewegung. Münster, Germany: Unrast Verlag, 2016. .
Subcomandante Marcos (2020). Schriften über Krieg und Politische Ökonomie. Münster, Germany: Unrast Verlag, 2020. .

Greek 

 Σουμπκομαντάντε Μάρκος [Subcomandante Marcos]; Μανουέλ Βάθκεθ Μονταλμπάν [Manuel Vázquez Montalbán]. Μάρκος. Η επανάσταση και οι καθρέφτες [The Revolution and the Mirrors]. Athens, Greece, 2003: .

.

Indonesian 

  Indonesian translation of Marcos' essays and stories (1994–2001).
  Indonesian translation of Marcos' essays and stories (2001–2004).

Italian 

 Subcomandante Marcos (1995). Io, Marcos. Il nuovo Zapata racconta, Milano, Feltrinelli, 1995. .
 Subcomandante Marcos (1995). Dalle montagne del sud-est messicano, Roma, Edizioni Lavoro, 1995. .
 Subcomandante Marcos (1996). Dal Chiapas al mondo. Scritti, discorsi e lettere sulla rivoluzione zapatista, 2 voll., Pomezia, Erre Emme, 1996. .
 Subcomandante Marcos (1996). El Sup. Racconti per una notte di asfissia. Testi di Marcos e Don Durito, a c. di Laboratorio occupato SKA e C. S. Leoncavallo, Milano, Spray Edizioni, 19962.
 Subcomandante Marcos (1997). Il sogno zapatista, con Yvon Le Bot, Milano, Mondadori, 1997. .
 Subcomandante Marcos (1997). I racconti del vecchio Antonio, Bergamo, Moretti & Vitali, 1997. .
 Subcomandante Marcos (1997). La quarta guerra mondiale è cominciata, Roma, Il manifesto, 1997.
 Subcomandante Marcos (1999). Don Durito della Lacandona, Bergamo, Moretti & Vitali, 1998. .
 Subcomandante Marcos (1999). La storia dei colori, Roma, Minimum Fax, 1999. .
 Subcomandante Marcos (2000). La spada, l'albero, la pietra e l'acqua, Firenze, Giunti, 2000. .
 Subcomandante Marcos (2001). Racconti per una solitudine insonne, Milano, Oscar Mondadori, 2001. .
 Subcomandante Marcos (2004). Nei nostri sogni esiste un altro mondo. Appunti dal movimento zapatista, Milano, Oscar Mondadori, 2003. .
 Subcomandante Marcos (2004). Libertad y dignidad. Scritti su rivoluzione zapatista e impero, Roma, Datanews, 2004. .
 
 Subcomandante Marcos (2009). Così raccontano i nostri vecchi. Narrazioni dei popoli indigeni durante l'Altra Campagna, Napoli, Intra Moenia, 2009. .
 Laura Castellanos; Subcomandante Marcos (2009). Punto e a capo. Presente, passato e futuro del movimento zapatista, Roma, Alegre, 2009. .
Subcomandante Marcos/Galeano (2018). Hablar colores. Parlare a colori. Napoli, Italy: Iemme Edizioni, 2018. .

Japanese 

 マルコス副司令官 [Subcomandante Marcos] (1995). もう、たくさんだ!―メキシコ先住民蜂起の記録 [Ya Basta! Documents of Mexico's Indigenous Peoples Uprising]. 東京 [Tokyo], 日本 [Japan]: 現代企画室 [Gendaikikakusha], 1995. .
 マルコス副司令官 [Subcomandante Marcos]; イグナシオ ラモネ  [Ignacio Ramonet] (2002).マルコス・ここは世界の片隅なのか―グローバリゼーションをめぐる対話 [Marcos: a dialogue concerning globalization – is this a remote corner of the world?  = Rebel Dignity: conversations with Subcomandante Marcos]. 東京 [Tokyo], 日本 [Japan]:  現代企画室 [Gendaikikakusha], 2002. .
 マルコス副司令官 [Subcomandante Marcos]; イボン・ル・ボ  [Yvon Le Bot] (2005). サパティスタの夢 [The Zapatista Dream]. 東京 [Tokyo], 日本 [Japan]: 現代企画室 [Gendaikikakusha], 2005. .
 マルコス副司令官 [Subcomandante Marcos] (2004). ラカンドン密林のドン・ドゥリート― [Don Durito of the Lacandon Jungle]. 東京 [Tokyo], 日本 [Japan]: 現代企画室 [Gendaikikakusha], 2004. .
 マルコス副司令官 [Subcomandante Marcos] (2005). 老アントニオのお話 [Old Antonio's Tales]. 東京 [Tokyo], 日本 [Japan]: 現代企画室 [Gendaikikakusha], 2005. .

Norwegian 
• Subcomandante Marcos (2013). De Andre Historiene fortellinger av Subcomandante Marcos [The Other Tales; a translation from the Spanish of Los Otros Cuentos]. Oslo: 2013. .

Russian 

 Субкоманданте Маркос [Subcomandante Marcos] (2002). Другая революция. Сапатисты против нового мирового порядка [Another revolution. Zapatistas against the New World Order]. М.: Гилея [Publisher: Gilea] — (Час «Ч». Современная мировая антибуржуазная мысль) [Hour "H". Modern world anti-bourgeois thought]: Moscow. .
 Субкоманданте Маркос [Subcomandante Marcos] (2005). Четвёртая мировая война [The Fourth World War]. Екатеринбург [Yekaterinburg]: Ультра [Ultra]. Культура [Culture] — (Жизнь Zaпрещённых Людей) [Life of Outlawed People]. .

Spanish 

Subcomandante Marcos (1995). Chiapas: del Dolor a la Esperanza [Chiapas: from sorrow to hope]. Madrid, Spain: Libros de la Catarata, 1995. .
Subcomandante Marcos, Adolfo Gilly & Carlo Ginzburg. Discusión sobre la historia [A Discussion regarding history]. Madrid, Spain: Taurus, 1995. .
Subcomandante Marcos; René Báez (1996). Conversaciones con Marcos [Conversations with Marcos]. Quito, Peru; Eskeletra, 1996. .

Republished: The Story of Colors / La Historia de los Colores. El Paso, TX, USA: Cinco Puntos Press.
Bilingual softcover: (May 1, 1999) 
Bilingual hardcover: (April 1, 2003) 
Republished: Story of Colours/La Historia de los Colores: A Folktale from the Jungles of Chiapas. London, UK: Latin America Bureau.
Bilingual: (February 20, 2001) 

Subcomandante Marcos (1999). Siete piezas sueltas del rompecabezas mundial [The Seven Loose Pieces of the Global Jigsaw Puzzle]. Barcelona, Spain: Virus Editorial, 1999. .
Subcomandante Marcos (1999). La revuelta de la memoria. Textos del Subcomandante Marcos y del EZLN sobre la historia [The Revolt of Memory: texts by Subcommander Marcos and the EZLN concerning history]. Chiapas, Mexico: Centro de Información y análisis de Chiapas (CIACH), 1999. .
Subcomandante Marcos (1999). Relatos de El Viejo Antonio [Tales by Old Antonio]. Málaga, Spain: Grupo Editorial Guarache, 1999.

Subcomandante Marcos (2000). Cuentos para una soledad desvelada: textos del subcomandante insurgente Marcos [Tales for a Sleepless Solitude: texts by Subcomandante Marcos]. México: Publicaciones Espejo.

Subcomandante Marcos (2001). Los del color de la tierra: textos insurgentes desde Chiapas [Those the colour of the earth; insurgent texts from Chiapas]. Navarra, Spain: Txalaparta 2001. .
Subcomandante Marcos; Cristian Calónico (2001). Marcos: historia y palabra (entrevista) [Marcos: history and word (interview)]. Mexico City, Mexico; Universidad Autónoma Metropolitana, 2001. .
Subcomandante Marcos; Ignacio Ramonet (2001). Marcos. La dignidad rebelde. Conversaciones con el Subcomandante Marcos [Marcos: Rebel Dignity: conversations with Subcomandante Marcos]. Valencia, Spain: Ediciones cybermonde, 2001, .
Subcomandante Marcos; Marta Durán (2001). El tejido del pasaâañas: entrevista con el subcomandante Marcos [The Fabric of the Ski-mask: Interview with Subcomandante Marcos]. Mexico City, México: Rizoma, 2001. .

Republished: 2002. Miami, FL, USA: Santillana USA Publishing.

Subcomandante Marcos (2003). México 2003. Otro calendario el de la Resistencia [Mexico 2003. An Other Calendar of Resistance]. Mexico City, Mexico: Ediciones del Frente Zapatista de Liberación Nacional. No ISBN.

Subcomandante Marcos (2007). Noches de fuego y desvelo [Fiery and Sleepless Nights]. Guadalajara, México: Colectivo Callejero, 2007.
Subcomandante Marcos (2007). Según cuentan nuestros antiguos...relatos de los pueblos indios durante la otra campaña [According to our elders ... stories of the Indian peoples during the Other Campaign]. Mexico City, Mexico: Rebeldía, ArteZ grafica. No ISBN.

Laura Castellanos; Subcomandante Marcos (2008). Corte de Caja: Entrevista al Subcomandante Marcos [Tallying Results: An Interview with Laura Castellanos]. México, DF: Grupo Editorial Endira.
El Kilombo Intergalactico; Subcomandante Marcos (2008). Las Nuevas Fronteras: una entrevista con el Subcomandante Marcos [New Frontiers: An Interview with Subcomandante Insurgente = Marcos Beyond Resistance: Everything. An Interview with Subcomandante Insurgente Marcos]. Buenos Aires, Argentine; Tinta Limón Ediciones, 2008. .
Subcomandante Marcos; et al. (2009). Primer Coloquio Internacional In Memoriam Andrés Aubry [First International Colloquium In Memory of Andrés Aubry]. San Cristóbal de Las casas, Chiapas, Mexico; Cideci Unitierra Ediciones, 2009. No ISBN.
Subcomandante Marcos (2010). Huellas de Elías Contreras: Recopilación de textos del SCI Marcos [Footprints of Elías Contreras: Compilation of texts by Subcomandante Insurgent Marcos]. Mexico City, Mexico: Ediciones Rebeldía. No ISBN.
Subcomandante Marcos (2012). Caracoles y Juntas de Buen Gobierno Zapatistas: mandar obedeciendo y autonomía [Zapatista Caracols and Councils of Good Government; command obeying and autonomy]. Mexico City, Mexico: Equipo de Apoyo de la Comisión VI del EZLN. No ISBN.
Subcomandante Marcos (2012). El Viejo Antonio. Edición corregida y aumentada [Old Antonio, corrected and augmented edition]. México, D.F.: Ediciones Eón, 2012. .

Subcomandante Marcos/Galeano (2017). Habrá una vez [Once Upon a Time]. Mexico : Publisher not identified.
Subcomandante Marcos/Galeano (2017). Escritos Sobre la Guerra y la Economía Política [Writings on War and Political Economy]. México, DF: Pensamiento Crítico Ediciones.
Subcomandante Marcos/Galeano (2018). Hablar colores [To Speak Colours]. México, DF: Estampa Artes Gráficas.

Swedish 

 Subcomandante Marcos (2002). Från sydöstra Mexicos underjordiska berg [From southeastern Mexico's underground mountains]. Stockholm, Sweden: Karneval förlag, 2002. .
 Subcomandante Marcos; Paco Ignacio Taibo II (2006). Osaliga döda: kriminalroman [Uncomfortable Dead: A Crime Novel]. Falun, Sweden: Ordfront Förlag, 2006. .

Turkish 

 Subcomandante Marcos (2003). Zapatista Hikâyeleri [Zapatista Stories]. Istanbul, Turkey: Agora Kitapligi, 2003. .
 Subcomandante Marcos (2007). Direnişin Ötesi: her şey [Beyond Resistance: Everything]. Ankara, Turkey: Bilim ve sosyalizm yayinlari, 2015. ISBN 9789758589166.

References 

Bibliographies by writer
Bibliographies of Mexican writers
Zapatista Army of National Liberation